C.J. & Company (also C.J. & Co. or C.C. & Co.) was a disco group from Detroit, Michigan. They were the partnership of producers Dennis Coffey and Mike Theodore.  Their highest charting single in the US was "Devil's Gun", which reached #36 on the Billboard pop chart, spending 29 weeks on the HOT 100. It wound up being the #100 song of the year on the Billboard's year end charts, (though only peaking at #36), and #2 on the R&B chart in 1977. It also peaked at #43 in the UK Singles Chart. That song, along with "We Got Our Own Thing" (later sampled by Heavy D and the Boyz) and "Sure Can't Go to the Moon," hit #1 for five weeks on the Hot Dance Music/Club Play chart.

They released two full-length LPs, Devil's Gun (1977) and Deadeye Dick (1978) both for Westbound Records.
In 1998 a compilation CD was released with full length selected tracks from both LPs.

"Devil's Gun" was the first record played at the opening of Studio 54 by DJ Richie Kaczor.

Discography

Studio albums

Compilation albums
USA Disco (1998, Westbound)

Singles

 Single credited to C. J. & Company

See also
List of Billboard number-one dance club songs
List of artists who reached number one on the U.S. Dance Club Songs chart

References

External links

American disco groups
American dance music groups